The ALCO RS-27 (specification DL-640) is a diesel-electric locomotive built by ALCO between December 1959 and October 1962. Only 27 examples were manufactured. With ALCO's introduction of the Century Series line, the C-424 (specification DL-640A) replaced the RS-27 in the builder's catalog.  Today, the Minnesota Commercial Railway has the only two RS-27s left in existence, both operational.

Original Owners

See also 
 List of ALCO diesel locomotives

References

External links
 Sarberenyi, Robert. Alco RS27 Original Owners.

Diesel-electric locomotives of the United States
B-B locomotives
RS27
Railway locomotives introduced in 1959
Freight locomotives
Standard gauge locomotives of the United States